Nathan Bitumazala (born 10 December 2002) is a French professional footballer who plays as a defensive midfielder for Belgian First Division A club Eupen.

Career
A former youth academy player of Savigny-le-Temple, Bitumazala joined the Paris Saint-Germain Academy in 2015. He signed his first professional contract on 3 September 2020, tying him to the club until June 2023. On 14 July 2021, he made his first appearance for the senior team in a 4–0 friendly win over Le Mans. His competitive debut came on 11 September 2021, as he came on as a substitute in a 4–0 Ligue 1 win over Clermont.

On 17 August 2022, Bitumazala joined Eupen on a four-year deal until June 2026.

Personal life
Born in France, Bitumazala is of DR Congolese descent.

Career statistics

Honours
Paris Saint-Germain

 Ligue 1: 2021–22

References

External links
 
 

2002 births
Living people
Sportspeople from Fontainebleau
Footballers from Seine-et-Marne
Black French sportspeople
French sportspeople of Democratic Republic of the Congo descent
Association football midfielders
French footballers
Paris Saint-Germain F.C. players
K.A.S. Eupen players
Ligue 1 players
Championnat National 3 players
French expatriate footballers
French expatriate sportspeople in Belgium
Expatriate footballers in Belgium